Angela Browne (14 June 1938 – 20 June 2001) was a British actress. She had a recurring role in the early 1960s crime series Ghost Squad. She also appeared in episodes of shows such as Danger Man, No Hiding Place, The Saint, The Avengers, The Prisoner,  Upstairs, Downstairs and Minder. In 1966 she appeared in the Norman Wisdom comedy film Press for Time.

Personal life
She was married to actor Francis Matthews from 1963 until her death; they had three sons together. They appeared in the 1962 TV miniseries The Dark Island and the 1967 film Just Like a Woman, and also co-starred in a 1970 episode of his show Paul Temple. Browne gave up acting in 1990.

Death
Browne died on 20 June 2001 at the age of 63. She was survived by her husband, actor Francis Matthews and their three sons, Damien, Paul and Dominic. Matthews died thirteen years later on 14 June 2014 at the age of 86.

Selected filmography

Film
 Carry On Nurse (1959) – Young Nurse (uncredited)
 Doctor in Love (1960) – Susan, Occupational Therapist (uncredited)
 A Story of David (1961) – Michal
 Press for Time (1966) – Eleanor Lampton
 Just Like a Woman (1967) – Scilla's Friend

Television
 Scotland Yard (The Ghost Train Murder) (1959) – Sergeant Brown
 Ghost Squad (1961–63) – Helen Winters
 The Dark Island (1962) - Mary Somers
 Out of This World (Impostor) (1962) - Jean Baron
 No Hiding Place (Last Flight) (1963) - Fiona Sharpe
 The Saint (The Elusive Ellshaw) (1963) – Anne Ripwell
 Court Martial (1965–66) –  Sergeant Yolanda Perkins
 The Avengers (How to Succeed .... At Murder) (1966) –  Sara / Miss Penny 
 The Prisoner - A Change of Mind (1967) – Number Eighty-Six
 The Tenant of Wildfell Hall (1968) - Lady Annabella Lowborough
 Paul Temple (Games People Play) (1970) – Juliet
 Upstairs, Downstairs - Desirous of Change (1973) - Comtesse Lili de Ternay
 Kizzy (1976) – Mrs. Cuthbert
 Breakaway (1980) - Margaret Randell
 Minder (Caught in the Act, Fact) (1980) – Lady Margaret Thompson
 Butterflies (1983) - Amanda
 The Adventures of Sherlock Holmes (The Copper Beeches) (1984) - Mrs Toller
 Brat Farrar (1986) - Beatrice Ashby
 Chelworth (1989) - Barbara Chivers

References

Bibliography
 Tise Vahimagi & Michael Grade. British television: an illustrated guide. Oxford University Press, 1996.

External links

1938 births
2001 deaths
British television actresses
British stage actresses
British film actresses
People from Surrey
20th-century British actresses
Alumni of RADA
20th-century British businesspeople